The Fleet Foxes is the debut EP by American band Fleet Foxes, self-released in 2006. Sold by the band at local shows in Seattle, only 50 copies were made. It was released in the fall of 2006 around the Seattle area, and its success led to the eventual signing to Sub Pop records. The album was produced and recorded by veteran Seattle producer Phil Ek. It was remastered and reissued in 2018 as part of the First Collection 2006–2009 boxed set.

Cover inspired on Alfred Hitchcock's "North by Northwest" art movie.

Track listing

References 

Fleet Foxes albums
2006 debut EPs
Albums produced by Phil Ek
Self-released EPs